Timothy Herring (born May 7, 2000) is a U.S. Virgin Islands international soccer player who plays as a midfielder. He is from Jacksonville, Florida and attended Terry Parker High School. Herring is a natural goalscorer with the ability to score with both feet.

Career 
After playing in high school at Terry Parker High School, Herring joined Wabash College's soccer team.

In his first season at Wabash, Herring scored eight goals in 17 matches and was named the teams offensive player of the year. However, he missed much of his second season due to an injury, but he managed to score once in four games. In the 2020 season, Herring scored once in three games.

International 
Herring made his debut for the U.S. Virgin Islands national team on March 27, 2021, in a 2022 FIFA World Cup qualification match against Antigua and Barbuda, coming on as a late substitute.

Career statistics

International

2000 births
Living people
Wabash College alumni
United States Virgin Islands soccer players
United States Virgin Islands international soccer players
Association football midfielders

References

External links